is located in Tarama, Miyako District, Okinawa Prefecture, Japan.

The airport is operated by the prefecture, and is classified as a third-class airport.

Airlines and destinations

References

External links
 Tarama Airport
 Tarama Airport Guide from Japan Airlines
 

Airports in Okinawa
Tarama, Okinawa